Kram may refer to:

 KRAM, a defunct radio station once licensed to serve West Klamath, Oregon, United States
 KRAM-LP, a radio station (96.7 FM) licensed to serve Montevideo, Minnesota, United States
 Kram (musician), the stage name for Mark Maher, a member of Australian band Spiderbait
 Kram (novel), a novel by Hans-Eric Hellberg
 Kram, a term for surnames among Kashmiris

See also 
 
 Le Kram, a town in Tunisia
 Cram (disambiguation)
 Karm (disambiguation)